Mid-term parliamentary elections were held in Cuba on 1 November 1930 in order to fill half the seats in the House of Representatives, as well as 24 seats in the Senate. The Liberal Party was the biggest winner, taking 28 of the 59 seats in the House and 18 of the 24 seats in the Senate.

Results

Senate

House of Representatives

References

Cuba
Parliamentary elections in Cuba
1930 in Cuba
November 1930 events
Election and referendum articles with incomplete results